Danijel Morariju (born 1 January 1991) is a Serbian football defender who plays for Austrian club USV St. Pantaleon.

External links
 
 Danijel Morariju stats at utakmica.rs
 Danijel Morariju stats at footballdatabase.eu

1991 births
People from Bela Crkva
Serbian people of Romanian descent
Living people
Serbian footballers
Association football defenders
FK Čukarički players
FK Mladi Radnik players
KS Lushnja players
ACS Poli Timișoara players
AFC Eskilstuna players
FK Kolubara players
SV Austria Salzburg players
Serbian SuperLiga players
Serbian First League players
Kategoria Superiore players
Liga I players
Liga II players
Superettan players
Austrian Regionalliga players
Serbian expatriate footballers
Serbian expatriate sportspeople in Albania
Expatriate footballers in Albania
Serbian expatriate sportspeople in Romania
Expatriate footballers in Romania
Serbian expatriate sportspeople in Sweden
Expatriate footballers in Sweden
Serbian expatriate sportspeople in Austria
Expatriate footballers in Austria